Kathryn Jane Worden is an Australian politician. She is a Labor member of the Northern Territory Legislative Assembly since 2016, representing the electorate of Sanderson.

Early life and career
Worden moved to Australia with her family in 1981, attending school in Adelaide. She moved to Ngukkurr in the Northern Territory in 1985.

Worden was an Alderman on the City of Darwin Council for three years. She was the Chair of the Community and Cultural, and Arts and Cultural Development Committees. She was critical of Lord Mayor Katrina Fong Lim for accepting funding from the CLP Government for a velodrome that has to date still not been updated

Before entering politics, Worden worked at the Northern Territory Department of Housing overseeing complaints and compliance.

Worden has been married twice. She has four children and nine grandchildren.

Politics
Worden challenged Deputy Chief Minister Peter Styles in his seat of Sanderson. She won in a rout, taking over 60 percent of the vote on a swing of over 13 percent amid the CLP's near-meltdown in Darwin, enough to turn Sanderson into a safe Labor seat at one stroke. She actually won enough votes on the first count to take the seat without the need for preferences.

|}

Worden consolidated her hold on the seat in 2020, picking up a swing of over eight percent. She now sits on a majority of 19.5 percent, making Sanderson the second-safest seat in the Territory.

Following her win she was elected at ed to the Territory Caninet.  She currently holds the portfolios of Territory Families, Sport, Disabilities, Multicultural Affairs and Urban Housing.

References

Living people
Members of the Northern Territory Legislative Assembly
Australian Labor Party members of the Northern Territory Legislative Assembly
Northern Territory local councillors
Women members of the Northern Territory Legislative Assembly
British emigrants to Australia
21st-century Australian politicians
21st-century Australian women politicians
Year of birth missing (living people)
Women local councillors in Australia